Neasden Gaels GFC are a Gaelic Football team are based in Kingsbury, North London. Neasden Gaels were founded into the junior ranks of London GAA in February 1989 following a meeting between officials at McDonagh's Bar in Kingsbury, North West London. The founder members were Michael Cleary (Manchester), Roger O'Connor (Sligo), Jim Devine (Longford), Bobby Moynihan (Kerry), Claire Moynihan (London) and, of course, Danny O'Sullivan who hails from Killorglin in Kerry and Michael
McDonagh, proprietor of McDonagh's Bar, Kingsbury and a native of Galway who was also appointed as Neasden's first team manager.

Neasden Gaels had grown into a senior side by winning the London Intermediate Football Championship in 1996 and then winning the London Senior Football Championship in 1999 an unprecedented 10 years after the club's foundation. Neasden Gaels are now one of the highest ranked Gaelic Football teams in Britain and contested the 2008 London Senior Football final and London Senior Football final and are current London Senior Football champions in 2010. Neasden Gaels GFC came close to being the first ever London club team to progress to an All Ireland Club Senior semi final in 2011 with a All Ireland Quarter final defeat against title and eventual All Ireland champions Crossmaglen Rangers.

Notable players

 Scott Doran

See also
 Gaelic Athletic Association
 London Senior Football Roll of Honour on Wikipedia

References

External links
 GAA Official Website
 London GAA Official Website

Gaelic Athletic Association clubs in London
Sport in the London Borough of Brent